Mi Yang (born 24 January 1989 in Gansu, China) is a Chinese volleyball player. She represented her nation at the  London 2012 Olympics.

Personal life
Mi is a Muslim, and a member of the Hui ethnic group.

See also
China at the 2012 Summer Olympics#Volleyball
Volleyball at the 2012 Summer Olympics – Women's tournament

References

External links
 
 

1989 births
Living people
Chinese women's volleyball players
Olympic volleyball players of China
Volleyball players from Tianjin
Volleyball players at the 2012 Summer Olympics
Setters (volleyball)
Hui sportspeople
Chinese Muslims
21st-century Chinese women